Ginseng Mountain is a mountain located in the Catskill Mountains of New York northeast of Windham. Elm Ridge is located south, Mount Zoar is located east-southeast, and Mount Hayden is located northwest of Ginseng Mountain.

References

Mountains of Greene County, New York
Mountains of New York (state)